The 2018 BOOST National was held from December 11 to 16 at the Conception Bay South Arena in Conception Bay South, Newfoundland and Labrador. This will be the fourth Grand Slam and second major of the 2018–19 curling season.

The first all-Scottish Grand Slam final  saw Ross Paterson of Glasgow beat defending champions Bruce Mouat of Edinburgh 4–3 in an extra end to win his team's first Grand Slam. Rachel Homan beat Kerri Einarson 4–1 in the women's final, to win her ninth slam.

The event was sold out all week, owing to the popularity of the hometown Brad Gushue rink. The total attendance was 23,500 which was a Grand Slam record at the time.

Qualification
The top 14 men's and women's teams on the World Curling Tour order of merit standing as of November 5, 2018 qualified for the event. The Grand Slam of Curling may fill one spot in each division as a sponsor's exemption. In the event that a team declines its invitation, the next-ranked team on the order of merit is invited until the field is complete. The sponsor's exemption was not used, and the spot  was allocated to the highest-ranked remaining team on the order of merit.

Men
Top Order of Merit men's teams as of November 5: 
 Niklas Edin
 Brad Gushue
 Kevin Koe
 John Epping
 Bruce Mouat
 Reid Carruthers
 Brad Jacobs
 Peter de Cruz
 Jason Gunnlaugson
 Brendan Bottcher
 Steffen Walstad
 Matt Dunstone
 Glenn Howard
 John Shuster
 Yannick Schwaller
 Scott McDonald
 Braden Calvert
 Thomas Ulsrud
 Ross Paterson
 Rich Ruohonen
 Kirk Muyres

Women
Top Order of Merit women's teams as of November 5: 
 Anna Hasselborg
 Jennifer Jones
 Rachel Homan
 Kerri Einarson
 Tracy Fleury
 Silvana Tirinzoni
 Chelsea Carey
 Satsuki Fujisawa
 Casey Scheidegger
 Laura Walker
 Eve Muirhead
 Darcy Robertson
 Jamie Sinclair
 Nina Roth
 Isabella Wranå
 Allison Flaxey
 Anna Sidorova
 Kim Eun-jung
 Sayaka Yoshimura
 Jacqueline Harrison

Men

Teams

Round robin standings
Final round robin standings

Round robin results
All draw times are listed in Newfoundland Standard Time (UTC−3:30).

Draw 1
Tuesday, December 11, 7:00 pm

Draw 2
Wednesday, December 12, 9:00 am

Draw 3
Wednesday, December 12, 12:30 pm

Draw 4
Wednesday, December 12, 4:30 pm

Draw 5
Wednesday, December 12, 8:30 pm

Draw 7
Thursday, December 13, 12:30 pm

Draw 8
Thursday, December 13, 4:30 pm

Draw 9
Thursday, December 13, 8:30 pm

Draw 11
Friday, December 14, 12:30 pm

Draw 12
Friday, December 14, 4:30 pm

Tiebreakers
Friday, December 14, 8:30pm

Playoffs

Quarterfinals
Saturday, December 15, 11:00 am

Semifinals
Saturday, December 15, 7:30 pm

Final
Sunday, December 16, 1:30 pm

Women

Teams

Round robin standings
Final round robin standings

Round robin results
All draw times are listed in Newfoundland Standard Time (UTC−3:30).

Draw 1
Tuesday, December 11, 7:00 pm

Draw 2
Wednesday, December 12, 9:00 am

Draw 3
Wednesday, December 12, 12:30 pm

Draw 4
Wednesday, December 12, 4:30 pm

Draw 5
Wednesday, December 12, 8:30 pm

Draw 6
Thursday, December 13, 9:00am

Draw 8
Thursday, December 13, 4:30 pm

Draw 10
Friday, December 14, 9:00 am

Draw 11
Friday, December 14, 12:30 pm

Draw 13
Friday, December 14, 8:30 pm

Tiebreaker
Saturday, December 15, 11:00am

Playoffs

Quarterfinals
Saturday, December 15, 3:00 pm

Semifinals
Saturday, December 15, 7:30 pm

Final
Sunday, December 16, 5:30 pm

References

External links

The National (curling)
December 2018 sports events in Canada
2018 in Canadian curling
Conception Bay South
Curling in Newfoundland and Labrador
2018 in Newfoundland and Labrador